Finis Fox (1884–1949) was an American screenwriter and film director mainly active during the silent era.

Partial filmography

 The Jury of Fate (1917, writer)
 The Voice of Conscience (1917, writer)
 The Way of the Strong (1919, writer)
 Blackie's Redemption (1919, writer)
 Shadows of Suspicion (1919, writer)
 Please Get Married (1919, writer)
 False Evidence (1919, writer)
 Easy to Make Money (1919, writer)
 The Great Romance (1919, writer)
 The Parisian Tigress (1919, writer)
 The Web of Deceit (1920)
 Penny of Top Hill Trail (1921, writer)
 Scrap Iron (1921, writer)
 Man's Law and God's (1922, director)
 Merry-Go-Round (1923, writer)
 Bag and Baggage (1923, director)
 Tipped Off (1923, director)
 The Danger Girl (1926, writer)
 Winning the Futurity (1926, writer)
 Shipwrecked (1926, writer)
 The Flame of the Yukon (1926, writer)
 The Speeding Venus (1926, writer)
 Resurrection (1927, writer)

References

Bibliography
 Munden, Kenneth White. The American Film Institute Catalog of Motion Pictures Produced in the United States, Part 1. University of California Press, 1997.

External links
 

1884 births
1949 deaths
American film directors
Artists from Oklahoma
20th-century American screenwriters